The 1903 All-Ireland Senior Hurling Championship Final was the 16th All-Ireland Final and the culmination of the 1903 All-Ireland Senior Hurling Championship, an inter-county hurling tournament for the top teams in Ireland. The match was held at Jones' Road, Dublin, on 12 November 1905 between London, represented by club side Hibernians, and a Cork selection. The London champions lost to their Munster opponents on a score line of 3-16 to 1-1.

Match details

1
All-Ireland Senior Hurling Championship Finals
Cork county hurling team matches
London GAA matches
All-Ireland Senior Hurling Championship Final
All-Ireland Senior Hurling Championship Final, 1903